Dave is a given name, a shortened form of the name David, Davey, etc. The name means "beloved". 
Notable people with the name include:

People
 Dave Bailey (musician), professional name of American jazz drummer Samuel David Bailey
 Dave Bailey (runner), Canadian track and field athlete, later a pharmacologist
 Dave Barker, professional name of Jamaican musician David Crooks
 Dave Barry, American comedian and humor author
 Dave Bautista, American actor and former professional wrestler
 Dave Bayley, British songwriter, singer and producer
 Dave Brubeck (1920–2012), American jazz musician
 Dave Boat, American voice actor
 Dave Butterfield, American football player
 Dave Chappelle, American stand-up comedian, satirist and actor
 Dave Clark (musician), English drummer, rock singer, songwriter, record producer
 Dave Colclough, Welsh professional poker player
 Dave Coulier, American stand-up comedian and television/voice actor
 Dave Franco, American television and film actor
 Dave Frederick, American sportswriter and coach
 Dave Freeman (American author) (1961–2008), American author
 Dave Freeman (British writer), British film and television writer
 Dave Garnett (born 1970), American football player
 Dave Gibbons, British writer and artist of comics
 Dave Goelz, American puppeteer known for playing Gonzo on The Muppets
 Dave Gorman, English stand-up comedian, best known for his project Are You Dave Gorman?
 Dave Grohl, American rock musician and member of Nirvana and the Foo Fighters
 Dave Guard (1934–1991), American folk singer and songwriter, founding member of The Kingston Trio
 Dave Huismans (born 1979), Dutch musician known professionally as 2562
 Dave Kaye (1906–1996), British pianist
 Dave Keuning, American rock musician and member of The Killers
 Dave Koz, American jazz saxophonist
 Dave Lombardo, drummer for heavy metal bands Slayer and Fantômas
 Dave Mackintosh, drummer for power metal band DragonForce
 Dave Marshall (musician), American guitarist
 Dave Matthews, American jam musician
 Dave Meyers (basketball) (1953–2015), American basketball player
 Dave Minor (1922–1998), American basketball player
 Dave Murray (musician), guitarist for heavy metal band Iron Maiden
 Dave Mustaine, singer/guitarist/founder of American heavy metal band Megadeth
 Dave Nilsson (born 1969), Australian baseball player, manager
 Dave Polsky (born 2000), American television screenwriter
 Dave Ramsey, American personal finance advisor, radio show host, author, and businessman
 Dave Rozumek, American football player
 Dave Rubin (born 1976), American political commentator, YouTube personality, and talk show host
 Dave Saunders (volleyball), American volleyball player
 Dave Thomas (businessman) (1932–2002), American businessman, founder of Wendy's
 Dave Tucker (geologist), American geologist and IWW leader
 Dave Ulliott, English professional poker player
 Dave Valentin (1952–2017), American Latin jazz flautist
 Dave Weckl, American drummer
 Dave Welch, English professional poker player
 Dave Whinham (born 1957), American football coach

Fictional characters
 Dave (EastEnders), from the British soap opera EastEnders
 Dave, a character from the Cartoon Network show Camp Lazlo
 D.A.V.E., from The Batman television series
 David Bowman (Space Odyssey), in the book and movie 2001: A Space Odyssey
 Dave Lister, from the BBC comedy series Red Dwarf
 Dave Rudman, from the novel The Book of Dave (2006), by English novelist Will Self
 Dave Turner, in the television series Degrassi: The Next Generation
 Dave Strider, from the webcomic Homestuck
 David "Dave" Lizewski, the title character and the protagonist of the Kick-Ass series
 the title character of Dave the Barbarian, a Disney Channel cartoon series
 the title character of Meet Dave, a 2008 comedy film starring Eddie Murphy
 the title character of Dangerous Dave, a computer game by John Romero
 Dave, a fictional contestant from Total Drama Pahkitew Island 
 Dave, from the film Encino Man
 Dave, from the Australian comic strip Beyond the Black Stump
 Dave, from the American-Canadian flash-animated series Yin Yang Yo!
 David "Dave" Skunkerton Weeb, from the Canadian animated TV series Scaredy Squirrel
 Dave, a camp counselor from the TV series Camp Cretaceous.

See also
 Dav Pilkey
 Davey (given name) 
 David (name) 

Hypocorisms
English masculine given names